Nakrekal is a census town in Nalgonda district of the Indian state of Telangana. It is located in Nakrekal mandal in Nalgonda division..It is located about 26km from Suryapet and 29km from Nalgonda.

Geography
It has an average elevation of 240 metres (790 ft).

Nearest Cities
Suryapet-26 km
Nalgonda-29 km
Hyderabad-109 km

Transport 
NH 65 connects the town with Erpedu road in Andhra Pradesh..It has good bus facility for Nalgonda, Suryapet and Hyderabad.

References 

Cities and towns in Nalgonda district
Mandal headquarters in Nalgonda district